Mohammed Jabbar Rubat Zerjawi (born June 29, 1993, in Basra, Iraq) is an Iraqi footballer who plays as a right back for Naft Al-Basra  in the Iraqi Premier League.

International debut
On 26 March 2011 Rabat made his international debut for Iraq against North Korea in a friendly match.

Honours

International
Iraq Youth team
 2012 AFC U-19 Championship: runner-up
 2013 FIFA U-20 World Cup: 4th Place
Iraq U-23
 AFC U-22 Championship: 2013
Iraq National football team
 21st Arabian Gulf Cup: runner-up

References

External links 
 on Goalzz.com

1993 births
Living people
Sportspeople from Basra
Al-Mina'a SC players
Iraqi footballers
Iraq international footballers
Association football fullbacks